James Henry McCrocklin was an American academic administrator and politician. He served as President of Texas State University from August 1964 to April 1969, and as the United States Under Secretary of Health, Education, and Welfare from July 1968 to January 1969. His career ended due to a plagiarism scandal that resulted in his doctoral degree being revoked.

References

Lyndon B. Johnson administration personnel
People from Texas
Presidents of Texas State University
Year of birth missing
Place of birth missing